FC Ukraine United is a Canadian soccer club founded in 2006. The team is currently a member of the Canadian Soccer League a league that is not sanctioned by any FIFA recognized body. Their home venue is located at Centennial Park Stadium in Etobicoke, Toronto, Ontario. The club is the only team in the CSL to represent the Ukrainian diaspora in the Greater Toronto Area.

History 
In 2006, Yuriy Hlyva, and Vladimir Koval, former professional footballers from the former Soviet Union established a club in order to accommodate and combine talent from the various Eastern Bloc countries located in Canada. As a result, FC Ukraine United were formed with a Ukrainian identity due to the majority of players originating from Ukraine. Malychenkov was given head coach responsibilities, while Koval served as the general manager. In 2007, the club initial began playing indoor soccer at Soccer City. In the spring of 2007, Ukraine United joined the Ontario Soccer League in the Multi Jurisdictional West Division. In their debut season in the OSL the team finished third in the standings and won the George Finnie Cup. The following season United won promotion to the Central Regional Division by winning the league.

During their three seasons in the Central Regional Division the team managed to win the Great Lakes Cup and secured a promotion to the Premier Central Division in 2011. During their time in the Premier Division United participated several times in the Diaspora World Cup hosted in Ternopil, Ukraine, and finished runner's up in the 2015 regular season. In 2016, Ukraine United was promoted to the professional ranks by joining the Canadian Soccer League.

In preparation for play in the CSL First Division Malychenkov recruited several import players with experience in the Professional Football League of Ukraine. Ukraine United made their professional debut on June 5, 2016 against Scarborough SC where they lost by a score of 2–0. On June 12, 2016 United recorded their first victory over Hamilton City SC in a 3–2 victory with goals coming from Ivliev and Derevlov. In their debut season the western Toronto side competed with York Region Shooters over the First Division title and managed to achieve a second-place ranking in the standings and recorded the league's big offensive record.

In the first round of the postseason, Ukraine United faced Brantford Galaxy and with goals coming from Oleksandr Muzychuk, Derevlov, and Shutov they advanced to the semifinals with a 3–0 victory. Their opponents in the next round were the Serbian White Eagles, but were eliminated from playoff contention from a 1–0 loss. For the 2017 season, Ukraine United voluntarily relegated themselves to the Second Division and produced a perfect season. The following season they returned to the First Division, and secured the division title. In 2019, they reached the CSL Championship final, but were defeated by Scarborough SC.

Players

Current squad

Year-by-year

References

External links  
FC Ukraine United website

 
Soccer clubs in Toronto
Etobicoke
Canadian Soccer League (1998–present) teams
Ukrainian association football clubs outside Ukraine
Ukrainian diaspora in Canada
Association football clubs established in 2006
2006 establishments in Ontario
Soccer clubs in Ontario